Sino ang Maysala?: Mea Culpa ( / ) is a 2019 Philippine drama television series starring Jodi Sta. Maria, Bela Padilla, Ketchup Eusebio, Tony Labrusca, Kit Thompson, Sandino Martin and Ivana Alawi. The series aired on ABS-CBN's Primetime Bida evening block and worldwide via The Filipino Channel from April 29, 2019 to August 9, 2019, replacing Halik.

Series overview

Episodes

Season 1 (2019)

References

Lists of Philippine drama television series episodes